WonderHowTo is a community-developed instructional video guide website launched on January 30, 2008. WonderHowTo acts as both a directory and search engine for how-to videos on the web. The free-access website is privately owned and operated by Wonder How To, Inc.

WonderHowTo was founded in 2006 by Stephen Chao and Michael Goedecke. Backed by Cambridge, Massachusetts-based General Catalyst Partners, WonderHowTo.com launched as the world's largest free how-to video resource with almost 90,000 entries, hitting the 100,000th mark in less than two months. By March 2008, the site's audience had grown to 300,000 monthly unique visitors and 800,000 by July (source: Google Analytics). Partner Scripps Networks contributes instructional segments as well as handling advertising for the site.

Employing both human and automated curation, the how-to supersite aggregates and organizes links to thousands of videos featured on other popular how-to video site publishers, as well as specialized collections of how-to video from niche-targeted sites and servers worldwide. WonderHowTo is headquartered in Santa Monica, California.

Partners
On October 7, 2008, WonderHowTo signed a syndication partnership deal with VideoJug. Under the terms of the agreement, VideoJug will provide the video content to the website in return for licence fees and/or a cut of ad revenues.

WonderHowTo Network
As of 2020, the WonderHowTo network comprises several web properties including WonderHowTo.com, GadgetHacks.com, Next.Reality.News and Null-Byte

See also
 Instructables

References

External links
Official Website
System Administration Tutorials
How To Create Free Premium Canva Account

How-to websites
American educational websites
Internet properties established in 2008
Privately held companies based in California